The Gary American was a newspaper that operated from the 1920s to the 1990s in Gary, Indiana, serving the African-American community of that city. It was known for its strong stance in favor of civil rights, and its strong support of the Democratic Party.

Founded in 1927 as the Gary Colored American, for its first three decades the American was owned and operated by the Whitlock family. The American was a weekly for most of its history, became a biweekly in the 1980s and ceased publication in the late 20th century.

At the outset, the American covered only national and local Gary news. In the 1940s, however, it widened its geographic scope to incorporate a regular column on the African-American community in neighboring East Chicago.

History

A.B. Whitlock, who in 1921 had become the first African-American member of the Gary City Council, published the first issue of the Gary Colored American on November 10, 1927. The name changed to the Gary American with the issue of March 20, 1928.

The paper remained in the hands of the Whitlock family for several decades. A.B. Whitlock relinquished control to his son Henry Oliver Whitlock and daughter-in-law Edwina Harleston Whitlock in 1947. Henry Oliver Whitlock died of a heart attack on May 5, 1960, and Edwina Whitlock operated the paper for a year thereafter.

In 1961, Edwina Whitlock sold the American to a group of three purchasers, including James T. Harris, Jr., and Fred Harris, both of whom would serve in turn as managers of the paper.

From the 1960s until its closure, the Gary American was one of three African-American newspapers serving the city of Gary (together with the Gary Crusader and Gary Info), a uniquely large number among American cities.  For some of this period the city was also served by a special Gary edition of the Chicago Defender.

By the 1980s, the Gary American published only once every two weeks. The Gary Info, a competing paper that James T. Harris, Jr. founded in 1963, absorbed the Gary American in the late 20th century.

Impact

The American brought attention to many crucial public issues, including the fight against police brutality and the struggle to integrate the Gary's only public beach at Marquette Park, which continued until at least 1951. It heralded Gary's adoption of a fair employment practices ordinance in 1950, the first city ordinance of its kind. It also covered the African-American struggle within the United Steel Workers union at the Gary Works. It also chronicled important gains by the city's African-American community, including the first African-American recipient of a taxi license in 1945, and the first African-American appointee to the Gary School Board in 1949.

In addition to these local battles, the American also provided close coverage of the national U.S. civil rights movement, heralding such developments as the Brown v. Board of Education decision in 1954, and the Greensboro sit-ins of 1960.

Although founder A.B. Whitlock had been a Republican, over time the American became increasingly tied to the Democratic Party, although it endorsed some Republicans for office even after World War II.

Following the election of Richard Hatcher as mayor of Gary in 1967, the American focused increasingly on community revitalization efforts.

See also
Gary Crusader
Frank Marshall Davis

Works cited

References

Defunct African-American newspapers
Defunct newspapers published in Indiana
Publications established in 1927
1927 establishments in Indiana
History of Gary, Indiana